The Central Bank of Myanmar 
(abbreviated CBM) is the central bank of Myanmar (formerly Burma).

Organisation 
Its headquarter located in Naypyidaw, and it has branches in Yangon and Mandalay. 

The Governor is Kyaw Kyaw Maung and three Vice Governors are Soe Min, Soe Thein, Bobo Aung (Mohammed Aarif) and Bo Bo Nge.

History 
The Central Bank of Myanmar was founded as the Union Bank of Burma on 3 April 1948 by the Union Bank of Burma Act, 1947 and took over the functions of the Rangoon branches of the Reserve Bank of India. The Union Bank of Burma was opened at the corner of Merchant Road and Sule Pagoda Road and had a sole right of currency issue.

In 2013, the Central Bank of Myanmar became an autonomous and independent regulatory body by the Central Bank of Myanmar Law which was enacted by the Myanmar Parliament.

During the 2021 Myanmar coup d'état, military authorities removed the central bank's civilian-appointed leadership, including governor Kyaw Kyaw Maung, and deputy governor Bo Bo Nge, who was sentenced to 20 years in prison in December 2022 under politically-motivated corruption charges. The military regime, the State Administration Council, then appointed Than Nyein in Kyaw Kyaw Maung's place. On 19 August 2022, the military regime appointed Than Than Swe as the governor.

Role 
CBM has liberalised the financial organisations for competition, efficiency and integration into the regional financial system. As of the end of October 2020, there 27 non-banking finance companies that are currently licensed by the Central Bank. According to the changes in the economic requirements of the country, the Central Bank rate has been increased from 10 percent to 12 percent since 1 April 2006.

Agricultural liberalisation speeded up after the elimination of the government procurement system of the main agricultural crops such as rice, pulses, sugarcane, cotton, etc., in 2003–04. The state also reduced the subsidised agricultural inputs, especially fertiliser. With an intention to enhance private participation in trade of agricultural products and inputs, the government is now encouraging export of crops which are in surplus in domestic markets or grown on fallow or waste land, giving opportunities to farmer and private producers.

Upon the guidance of the Ministry of Finance & Revenue, the CBM is responsible for financial stability and supervision of the financial sector in Myanmar. The institutional coverage of the financial supervisory authority includes state-owned banks and private banks in Myanmar. Two main approaches (on-site examination and off-site monitoring) are currently used for supervision, regulation and monitoring of financial stability.

On-site examination involves assessing banks’ financial activities and internal management, to identify areas where corrective action is required and to analyse their banking transactions and financial conditions, ensuring that they are in accordance with existing laws, rules and regulations and the instructions of the CBM by using CAMEL. Off-site monitoring operations are normally based on the weekly, monthly, quarterly and annual reports which are submitted by the banks to the CBM.

The Central Bank has also issued guidelines on the statutory reserve requirement, capital adequacy, liquidity, classification of N.P.L. and provision for bad and doubtful debts, single lending limit, etc. The reserve requirement, liquidity and capital adequacy required to be maintained by financial institutions have been prescribed according to the standards of the Bank for International Settlements (BIS). However, the implementation of Basel II will still take a few more years.

Members

As of end of May 2018, its current members are as follows:

List of governors

Source:

Appointment of governor

The proposed reappointment of Than Nyein as governor in February 2021.

See also
 Myanmar kyat
 List of banks in Burma
 Economy of Burma

Further reading

References

Banks of Myanmar
Myanmar
Government agencies of Myanmar
Buildings and structures in Naypyidaw
Banks established in 1948
Government agencies established in 1948
1948 establishments in Burma
Economy of Myanmar